Cedrick Jeremiah Poutasi  (born August 7, 1994) is an American football guard who is a free agent. He played college football at Utah.

Early years
Poutasi attended Desert Pines High School in Las Vegas, Nevada. He was rated by Rivals.com as a four-star recruit. He committed to the University of Utah to play college football.

College career
Poutasi attended Utah from 2012 to 2014. He took over as a starter his freshman season and remained a starter through his junior season.

After his junior season, Poutasi entered 2015 NFL Draft.

Professional career

Tennessee Titans
Poutasi was selected with the 66th overall pick in the third round of the 2015 NFL Draft by the Tennessee Titans. On September 2, 2016, he was released by the Titans as part of final roster cuts.

Jacksonville Jaguars
On September 5, 2016, Poutasi was signed to the Jacksonville Jaguars' practice squad. He was promoted to the active roster on November 18, 2016. He was placed on injured reserve on December 20, 2016 after suffering an ankle injury in Week 15.

On September 3, 2017, Poutasi was waived by the Jaguars and was re-signed to the practice squad. He was released on September 20, 2017.

Los Angeles Rams
On November 15, 2017, Poutasi was signed to the Los Angeles Rams' practice squad, but was released six days later.

Denver Broncos
On December 5, 2017, Poutasi was signed to the Denver Broncos' practice squad. He signed a reserve/future contract with the Broncos on January 1, 2018.

On September 1, 2018, Poutasi was waived by the Broncos.

Salt Lake Stallions
In January 2019, Poutasi joined the Salt Lake Stallions of the Alliance of American Football.

Arizona Cardinals
After the AAF suspended football operations, Poutasi signed with the Arizona Cardinals on April 8, 2019, but was waived a week later.

Poutasi was selected by the Jousters of The Spring League during its player selection draft on October 11, 2020.

Las Vegas Raiders
On August 4, 2021, Poutasi signed with the Las Vegas Raiders. He was waived on August 31, 2021 and re-signed to the practice squad the next day. After the Raiders were eliminated in the 2021 Wild Card round of the playoffs, he signed a reserve/future contract on January 17, 2022. He was waived on February 28, 2022.

References

External links
Utah Utes bio

1994 births
Living people
Sportspeople from Las Vegas
Players of American football from Nevada
American football offensive tackles
Utah Utes football players
Tennessee Titans players
Jacksonville Jaguars players
Los Angeles Rams players
Denver Broncos players
American people of Tongan descent
American sportspeople of Samoan descent
Salt Lake Stallions players
Arizona Cardinals players
The Spring League players
Las Vegas Raiders players